Salbia cassidalis is a moth in the family Crambidae. It was described by Achille Guenée in 1854. It is found in Brazil, Ecuador, Puerto Rico, Cuba, Jamaica, Costa Rica, Panama and Mexico.

References

Spilomelinae
Moths described in 1854